Scolia nobilitata, also known as the noble scoliid wasp, is a species of scoliid wasp in the family Scoliidae.

Subspecies 
Three subspecies are listed for S. nobilitata:
 Scolia nobilitata nobilitata Fabricius, 1805
 Scolia nobilitata otomita Saussure, 1858
 Scolia nobilitata tricincta  Say, 1823

Gallery

References

Scoliidae